The following lists events that happened during 2007 in South Africa.

Incumbents
 President: Thabo Mbeki.
 Deputy President: Phumzile Mlambo-Ngcuka.
 Chief Justice: Pius Langa.

Cabinet 
The Cabinet, together with the President and the Deputy President, forms part of the Executive.

National Assembly

Provincial Premiers 
 Eastern Cape Province: Nosimo Balindlela 
 Free State Province: Beatrice Marshoff 
 Gauteng Province: Mbhazima Shilowa 
 KwaZulu-Natal Province: S'bu Ndebele
 Limpopo Province: Sello Moloto
 Mpumalanga Province: Thabang Makwetla 
 North West Province: Edna Molewa 
 Northern Cape Province: Elizabeth Dipuo Peters 
 Western Cape Province: Ebrahim Rasool

Events

January
 17 – South Africa is selected as the host of the sub-region's Maritime Rescue Co-ordination Centre. Included in the sub-region are Angola, Comoros, Madagascar, Mozambique and Namibia.

February
 6–8 – President of the People's Republic of China, Hu Jintao, visits South Africa.
 23 – South African Courts dismiss charges against Simon Mann, former British Army officer, security expert and mercenary, and 7 other suspected mercenaries.
 A large-scale Community Survey is conducted in all provinces by Statistics South Africa.

May
 2 – A Zimbabwean court rules that Simon Mann, former British Army officer, security expert and mercenary, be extradited to Equatorial Guinea to face charges of leading a failed coup d'état.

September
 10 – The National Prosecuting Authority obtains an arrest warrant for Jackie Selebi, president of Interpol and South Africa's National Police Commissioner.
 14 – A search warrant is added to the arrest warrant for Jackie Selebi.
 23 – Vusi Pikoli, Director of the National Prosecuting Authority, is suspended.

November
 5 – Tiny Makopo, dormitory matron at Oprah Winfrey's Leadership Academy for Girls, is arrested for the abuse at the academy of six girls aged 13–14 and one woman aged 23.

December
 18 – Jacob Zuma is elected chairman of the African National Congress.

Births
16 February – Stacey Fru, writer

Deaths
 4 January – Marais Viljoen, former State President. (b. 1915)
 9 January – Elmer Symons, motorcyclist. (b. 1977)
 18 March – Bob Woolmer, Proteas cricket coach from 1994 to 1999. (b. 1948)
 11 July – William Flynn, actor and comedian, (b. 1948)
 1 August – Ryan Cox, professional road racing cyclist (b. 1979)
 10 September – Stanley Nadas, (b.1949)
 18 October – Lucky Dube, reggae singer. (b. 1964)
 20 November – Ian Smith, former Prime Minister of Rhodesia. (b. 1919)
 22 November – Reg Park, British bodybuilder, businessman, and actor. (b. 1928)

Sports

Athletics
 11 February – George Mofokeng wins his second national title in the men's marathon, clocking 2:13:50 in Port Elizabeth.

Rugby
 20 October– South Africa defeats England 15–6 in the final to win the 2007 Rugby World Cup.

See also
2007 in South African television

References

South Africa
Years in South Africa
History of South Africa